The Estates General of 1464 was a parliamentary assembly of representatives of the constituent territories of the Burgundian Netherlands (now parts of France, Belgium, Luxembourg and the Netherlands). It was the first such assembly.

Convocation
Each of the territories represented already had parliamentary institutions (provincial estates) of its own. The convocation of a meeting of representatives of all of these territories was the initiative of the States of Flanders (between 20 and 24 December), followed by Philip the Good (on 25 December), and his son Charles the Bold (on 26 December). Although in first instance reacting to the initiative of the States of Flanders, Duke Philip and his son were quick to adopt the convocation of the Estates General in support of their policy of centralizing their rule over their various territories.

Composition
The precise composition of the Estates General of 1464 is unknown. A total of at least 81 delegates attended from the Duchy of Brabant, the County of Flanders (with a distinct delegation from Lille, Douai and Orchies), the County of Artois, the County of Hainaut, the County of Holland, the County of Namur, the Lordship of Mechelen, the County of Boulogne, and the County of Zeeland.

References

Historical legislatures in Belgium
States General of the Netherlands
1460s in the Burgundian Netherlands
1460s in France
1460s in the Holy Roman Empire
1464 in Europe